Saylee Swen (born February 29, 1984, in Monrovia) is a Liberian footballer (goalkeeper) playing currently for LPRC Oilers. He is also a member of the Liberia national football team.

External links 

Saylee Swen Is Goalie For Lone Star Against Cameroon - www.liberiansoccer.com

1984 births
Living people
Liberian footballers
Association football goalkeepers
Sportspeople from Monrovia
Liberia international footballers
Mighty Barrolle players
LPRC Oilers players